Carl Swenson (born April 20, 1970) is an American former cyclist and cross-country skier. He competed at the 1994 Winter Olympics, the 2002 Winter Olympics and the 2006 Winter Olympics.

Biography
Swenson competed at three Winter Olympics; the 1994 Winter Olympics, the 2002 Winter Olympics, and the 2006 Winter Olympics as a cross-country skier. He was a six-time national champion, competing in multiple Nordic events.

Swenson also competed in mountain biking during the skiing off-season, winning a silver medal in the mountain bike race at the 1999 Pan American Games. Three years later, he became the American national mountain bike champion. He retired from skiing after the 2006 Winter Olympics. As a mountain biker, Swenson also competed in endurance events 18-hour and 24-hour races.

Swenson studied at Dartmouth College. He later attended the S.J. Quinney College of Law at the University of Utah becoming a criminal lawyer. Between 2004 and 2006, Swenson was on the board of the International Ski Federation. The following year, he was on the board of directors of the United States Anti-Doping Agency.

Cross-country skiing results
All results are sourced from the International Ski Federation (FIS).

Olympic Games

World Championships

World Cup

Season standings

References

External links
 

1970 births
Living people
American male cross-country skiers
Olympic cross-country skiers of the United States
Cross-country skiers at the 1994 Winter Olympics
Cross-country skiers at the 2002 Winter Olympics
Cross-country skiers at the 2006 Winter Olympics
Sportspeople from Corvallis, Oregon
American male cyclists
Pan American Games medalists in cycling
Pan American Games silver medalists for the United States
Cyclists at the 1999 Pan American Games
Medalists at the 1999 Pan American Games